Botir Qоraev (born 8 April 1980 in Qarshi, Uzbek SSR, Soviet Union) is Uzbek footballer who plays as a defender for Nasaf Qarshi. He is a member of Uzbekistan national football team.

References

External links
 

1980 births
Living people
People from Qashqadaryo Region
Uzbekistani footballers
Uzbekistan international footballers
2007 AFC Asian Cup players
Association football defenders
FC Nasaf players
FK Mash'al Mubarek players
FC Shurtan Guzar players
AFC Cup winning players